Butuo County is a county of southern Sichuan Province, China. It is under the administration of the Liangshan Yi Autonomous Prefecture. It was incorporated in 1952,  and has continuously existed since 1960. The name 'Butou' is based on the Yi language words for hedgehog and pine tree, giving it the name "a place with hedgehogs and pine trees". It is the unofficial capital of the Yi People and the birthplace of the Torch Festival. The county has a population of 215,800, 97.2% of whom are Yi People.

Butou is considered very impoverished, traditional and still significantly influenced by the legacy of feudalism and slavery, which was only reformed in the 1950s. Most villagers make a living through animal husbandry. Almost all of the non-agrarian economy is concentrated in the county seat. It is a 'key county' for National Poverty Alleviation and Development work, with as of 2018, 122 poverty-stricken designated villages in the county, and 57,000 poor people.

The bamboo mouth harp (Kouxian) of Butou County was included as intangible cultural heritage of the Yi People.

Administrative divisions 
Butuo County administers 3 towns and 27 townships.

Towns:

 Temuli (特木里镇)
 Longtan (龙潭镇)
 Tuojue (拖觉镇)

Townships:

Climate

References

External links

Liangshan Yi Autonomous Prefecture
Amdo
County-level divisions of Sichuan
Yi people